The 1977 Australian Grand Prix was a motor race held at Oran Park International Raceway in Sydney, New South Wales, Australia on 6 February 1977. It was the forty second Australian Grand Prix and also the first round of the 1977 Rothmans International Series. The race was open to Australian Formula 1 cars and Australian Formula 2 cars.

The race was won by Warwick Brown (Lola T430), his first and only Australian Grand Prix victory. Alan Jones (Lola T332) actually finished his 58th and final lap 40 seconds ahead of Brown, however officials penalised Jones 60 seconds for jumping the start and he was officially classified in 4th place.

Classification 

Results as follows:

Qualifying

Race

Notes
 Pole Position: Warwick Brown – 1:05.7
 Fastest Lap: Alan Jones – 1:06.4
 Average speed of winning car: 138.6 km/h
 Alan Jones was penalised 60 seconds for jumping the start

References

Grand Prix
Australian Grand Prix
Formula 5000 race reports
Australian Grand Prix